Larz-Kristerz is a Swedish dansband founded in Älvdalen, Sweden in 2001, and winner of the 2008 edition of Dansbandskampen. Hem till dig stopped U2's No Line On the Horizon from reaching number 1, the only country where the album did not reach this position.

Members
Stefan Nykvist
Peter Larsson
Kent Lindén
Trond Korsmoe
Morgan Korsmoe
Mikael Eriksson
Torbjörn Eriksson

Discography

Albums

Singles

References

External links

 Larz-Kristerz official homepage (Swedish)

Musical groups established in 2001
Dansbands
2001 establishments in Sweden
Swedish-language singers